"An Alpine Idyll" is a short story by American writer Ernest Hemingway, set in Switzerland and presumably featuring protagonist Nick Adams (though not explicitly named) It was published in 1927 in the collection Men Without Women but then rejected by Scribner's Magazine, as being too genteel for their readers.

Plot summary
A mature Nick and a friend, John, return from a ski trip to Galtur. The story takes place in spring, with the characters noting that the season was not good for skiing and lamenting that they had stayed in Silvretta Alps too long. The story begins with Nick and John witnessing a peasant burial. The story concludes with Nick and John, who had gone into an inn for drinks, having a discussion with the innkeeper and the sexton who had performed the burial. There is a revelation that the peasant widower, who had been snowbound with his dead wife for months, had reportedly kept her body in the woodshed and used her mouth to hold a lantern. The characters wonder whether the story was true, and the innkeeper indicated it must have been, since the peasants were "beasts."

Reviews
Joseph W. Krutch reviews the story in The Nation at the time saying that it "makes the readers suddenly weary, both physically and spiritually". Another reviewer describes the work as "a gruesome tale written with great economy of detail.

Analysis
The story is known to be "hard to analyse". Several commentators of the 1950s and 1960s suggest that the skiing and corpse episodes may be thematically related. Edmund Wilson believes that because the skiers feel oppressed by remaining too long in the mountains, perhaps the same unnatural environment has had a dehumanizing effect on the peasant. Carlos Baker feels that the peasant may now be ashamed by the 'natural' people of the valley.

References

External links
 Full text of "An Alpine Idyll" at HathiTrust Digital Library
 

1927 short stories
Short stories by Ernest Hemingway
Switzerland in fiction
Autobiographical short stories